The Bath Assembly Rooms, designed by John Wood the Younger in 1769, are a set of assembly rooms located in the heart of the World Heritage City of Bath in England which are now open to the public as a visitor attraction. They are designated as a Grade I listed building.

During the Georgian era Bath became fashionable, and the architects John Wood, the Elder, and his son laid out new areas of housing for residents and visitors. Assembly rooms had been built early in the 18th century, but a new venue for balls, concerts and gambling was envisaged in the area between Queen Square, The Circus and the Royal Crescent. Robert Adam submitted a proposal that was rejected as too expensive. John Wood, the Younger raised funding through a tontine, and construction started in 1769. The new or upper assembly rooms opened with a grand ball in 1771 and became the hub of fashionable society, being frequented by Jane Austen and Charles Dickens, along with the nobility of the time.

The building, made of Bath stone, is arranged in a U shape. There are four main function rooms in the complex: the  ballroom—the largest Georgian interior in Bath; the tea room; the card room; and the octagon. The rooms have Whitefriars crystal chandeliers and are decorated with fine art.

In the 20th century they were used as a cinema and in 1931 were taken over by the Society for the Protection of Ancient Buildings and restored. They were bombed and burnt out during the Second World War, with restoration undertaken by Sir Albert Richardson before reopening in 1963. They are now owned by the National Trust and operated by Bath and North East Somerset Council for public functions. The basement of the building provides a home to the Fashion Museum.

History
Several areas of Bath had undergone development during the Stuart period; development increased during Georgian times, however, in response to the increasing number of visitors to the spa and resort town who required accommodation. The architects John Wood the Elder and his son John Wood the Younger laid out the new quarters in streets and squares, the identical façades of which gave an impression of palatial scale and classical decorum. Much of the creamy honey-coloured Bath stone used for construction throughout the city was obtained from the limestone Combe Down and Bathampton Down Mines owned by Ralph Allen (1694–1764).

The development at this time largely consisted of new residential areas located away from the old city centre. The elder John Wood designed Queen Square, the Circus, and Gay Street in 1735, which would be completed by the younger John Wood. Queen Square was the first speculative development by the elder John Wood, who lived in one of the houses. The Circus consists of three long, curved terraces that form a circular theatre intended for civic functions and games and inspired by the Colosseum in Rome. Finally the elder Wood also designed and developed Gay Street which links the two; the buildings on Gay Street are now largely Grade I listed buildings.

The most spectacular of Bath's terraces is the Royal Crescent, designed by the younger John Wood, and built between 1767 and 1774.

The heart of the Georgian city was Wood's Pump Room, which, together with its associated Lower Assembly Rooms, was designed by Thomas Baldwin, a local builder responsible for many other buildings in the city, including the terraces in Argyle Street and the Guildhall, The Lower Assembly Rooms consisted of two buildings. The first built in 1708 for Thomas Harrison overlooking Parade Gardens between North Parade and Bath Abbey. A large ballroom was added in 1720, with further enlargement in 1749 and 1810 when it became known as The Kingston Assembly Rooms. In 1728 another building, known as Lindsey's Assembly Rooms, was constructed, lasting until demolition around 1820 for the building of York Street. Harrison's Lower Assembly Rooms were devastated by a fire in December 1820  and rebuilt, lasting until demolition in 1933 for road improvements on the site now known as "Bog Island".

In around 1770 the neoclassical architect Robert Adam designed Pulteney Bridge, a three-arched bridge spanning the River Avon. He used as his prototype an original, but unused, design by Andrea Palladio for the Rialto Bridge in Venice. Adam also submitted plans for the new Assembly Rooms but these were rejected as too costly. John Wood, the Younger raised funding for the construction of the Assembly Rooms by the use of a Tontine, an investment plan that is named after the Neapolitan banker Lorenzo de Tonti, who is credited with inventing it in France in 1653. It combines features of a group annuity and a lottery. Each subscriber pays an agreed sum into the fund, and thereafter receives an annuity. As members die, their shares devolve to the other participants, and so the value of each annuity increases. On the death of the last member, the scheme is wound up. Construction started in 1769 and was completed in 1771, when a grand opening was held.

The Assembly Rooms formed the hub of fashionable Georgian society in the city, the venue being described as "the most noble and elegant of any in the kingdom". They were originally known as the Upper Rooms as there was also a lower assembly room in the city, which closed soon after the Upper Rooms opened. They served the newly built fashionable area which included the Circus, Queen Square and the Royal Crescent.

People would gather in the rooms in the evening for balls and other public functions, or simply to play cards. Mothers and chaperones bringing their daughters to Bath for the social season, hoping to marry them off to a suitable husband, would take their charge to such events where, very quickly, one might meet all the eligible men currently in the City. At one concert in 1779, attended by around 800 ladies and gentlemen, 60 members of the nobility were present. During the season, which ran from October to June, at least two balls a week were held, in addition to a range of concerts and other events. Scenes such as this feature in the novels of Jane Austen, who lived in Bath with her parents and sister from 1801 to 1805. Her two novels set in Bath, Northanger Abbey and Persuasion, were published in 1818 and both mention the Assembly Rooms:

Charles Dickens also visited Bath on several occasions. He gave public readings in the Assembly Rooms and mentions them in The Pickwick Papers (published in 1837):

George Bridgetower, an Afro-Polish-born virtuoso violinist, made his debut at the Assembly Rooms in 1789. Another young violinist, Thomas Linley the younger, played a series of concerts between 1771 and 1776. Many of the concerts during the late 18th and early 19th centuries were organised by Venanzio Rauzzini.

In the 20th century several changes took place, with the Ballroom becoming a cinema, until the Society for the Protection of Ancient Buildings became the owners in 1931. The building was restored by A Mowbray Green in 1938, with Oliver Messel as the interior designer. During the Bath Blitz of 25/26 April 1942, one of the retaliatory raids on England by the Baedeker Blitz following the RAF's raid on Lübeck, the Assembly Rooms were bombed and burnt out inside. After the cessation of hostilities in Europe, they were restored by Sir Albert Richardson, with work being completed in 1963. The ballroom ceiling had to be repaired after it collapsed in 1989.

Architecture

The limestone building has a slate hipped roof. It is rectangular with a projecting doric portico entrance and an extension to the rear. The interior is laid out in a U shape, with the larger Ball Room and Tea Room along either side with the octagonal Card Room at the end. The rooms have Whitefriars crystal chandeliers and are decorated with pictures by Thomas Gainsborough, Allan Ramsay (artist), Edwin Long and William Hoare.

The Ballroom has five chandeliers and capacity for up to 500 people. The Tea Room holds up to 250 people. It was the location for a banquet attended by The Prince of Wales for the BBC television series the Great British Menu. The Octagon is named for the shape of the room and has four fireplaces. It originally held an organ in the musicians gallery. In 1777 the Card Room was added. This is now used as a bar.

Current use

Today the rooms are owned by the National Trust and operated by Bath and North East Somerset Council. The main rooms are still available for hire for private functions. They are also used for concerts, including ones that are part of the Bath International Music Festival.

The basement of the building provides a home to the Fashion Museum, which was known before 2007 as the Museum of Costume. The collection was started by Doris Langley Moore, who gave her collection to the city of Bath in 1963. It focuses on fashionable dress for men, women and children from the late 16th century to the present day and has more than 30,000 objects. The earliest pieces are embroidered shirts and gloves from about 1600.

The grandeur of the building make it a popular location for feature films and television series set in the Georgian period. The BBC have used it as a location for the filming of an adaptation of Northanger Abbey in 1986 and in 1995 Persuasion.

See also
 List of National Trust properties in Somerset

References

External links

Bath Assembly Rooms information, National Trust
Assembly Rooms page, Bath Council

Cultural infrastructure completed in 1771
1771 establishments in England
Assembly
Tourist attractions in Bath, Somerset
Assembly rooms
Grade I listed assembly rooms
National Trust properties in Somerset